HMS Prince George was a 90-gun second-rate ship of the line of the Royal Navy, launched on 31 August 1772 at Chatham. During her career, she was upgraded to a 98-gun ship, through the addition of eight 12-pounder guns to her quarterdeck.

In 1780, Prince George was part of Rodney's fleet at the Battle of Cape St. Vincent.

On 12 April 1782 she was seventh in line in the attack on the French fleet at the Battle of the Saintes under the command of Captain Williams.

She fought at the Battle of Groix in 1795.

In 1807, Prince George, under Captain Woodley Losack, was in the West indies in the squadron under the command of Rear-Admiral Alexander Cochrane. The squadron captured the Telemaco, Carvalho and Master on 17 April 1807.

In December Prince George participated in Cochrane's expedition that captured the Danish islands of St Thomas on 22 December and Santa Cruz on 25 December. The Danes did not resist and the invasion was bloodless.

Fate
Prince George was converted to serve as a sheer hulk in 1832. In 1835 she was used in a series of gunnery trials as a target ship, the results of which contributed to the rapid introduction of the shell firing gun. The Prince George was broken up in 1839.

Gallery

References

Sources
 
 

Ships of the line of the Royal Navy
Barfleur-class ships of the line
1772 ships